Susan Pringle Frost (January 21, 1873 – October 6, 1960) was the organizer and first president of the Preservation Society of Charleston. She was a leader in the suffrage movement in Charleston, South Carolina and an important proponent of the preservation of Charleston's historic buildings.

Susan Pringle Frost was born in 1873 to Francis LeJau Frost and Rebecca Brewton Pringle in the Miles Brewton House, a house which her family had owned since 1765.

When her family's plantations and her father's fertilizer business declined, Frost returned to Charleston from school in North Carolina and began taking stenography classes so she could help support her family. In 1901, Frost started working as the secretary for Bradford Gilbert, the architect for the 1901–1902 South Carolina Interstate and West Indian Exposition in Charleston, South Carolina. She began working in real estate in 1909 while she was a court reporter, and she opened her own real estate office in 1920. In 1913, she formed the Equal Suffrage League in Charleston and also joined the National Women's Party.

The Joseph Manigault House on Meeting Street was threatened with demolition for a gas station. In response, on April 21, 1920, Frost convened the first meeting with 31 others of the Society for the Preservation of Old Dwellings. That organization became the Preservation Society of Charleston.

Frost combined both her interest in real estate and preservation when she bought many historic buildings in Charleston, restored them, and then resold them. She was especially involved in the area near East Bay Street and Tradd Street; her decision to paint a house a pastel color after restoring it was a precedent for other restorations of houses that are today known as Rainbow Row.

Frost died at the Miles Brewton House on October 6, 1960 and was added to the South Carolina Hall of Fame in 2015.

References

1873 births
1960 deaths
People from Charleston, South Carolina
American suffragists
Historical preservationists